Pecquencourt is a commune in the Nord department in northern France.

Geography

Climate

Pecquencourt has a oceanic climate (Köppen climate classification Cfb).

Population

Heraldry

Sister cities
 Sondershausen, Germany

See also
Communes of the Nord department

References

Communes of Nord (French department)